Events from the year 1852 in Scotland.

Incumbents

Law officers 
 Lord Advocate – James Moncreiff until February; then Adam Anderson until May; then John Inglis until December; then James Moncreiff
 Solicitor General for Scotland – George Deas; then John Inglis; then Charles Neaves

Judiciary 
 Lord President of the Court of Session and Lord Justice General – Lord Boyle until 5 May; then from 14 May Lord Colonsay
 Lord Justice Clerk – Lord Glencorse

Events 
 7–31 July – United Kingdom general election results in Conservative Party defeat in Scotland but victory across the UK as a whole.
 1 October – Patent Law Amendment Act comes into effect, merging the English, Scottish and Irish patent systems.
 28 December – Edinburgh-born George Hamilton-Gordon, 4th Earl of Aberdeen, becomes Prime Minister of the United Kingdom, leading a Whig-Peelite coalition.
 Kelvingrove Park laid out as West End Park in Glasgow.
 Two boatloads of emigrants leave the island of Raasay for Australia.
 Polled Herd Book established for Aberdeen Angus and Galloway cattle.
 Kirkcaldy High School established as Kirkcaldy Burgh School.
 The School of Arts of Edinburgh, predecessor of Heriot-Watt University, changes its name to the Watt Institution and School of Arts.
 George Hay Forbes founds Pitsligo Press.

Births 
 24 May – R. B. Cunninghame Graham, radical socialist politician and writer (died 1936 in Argentina)
 2 September - Durward Lely, opera singer and actor, (died 1944)
 11 September – James Mackay, 1st Earl of Inchcape, businessman and colonial administrator in India (died 1932 in Monte Carlo)
 2 October – William Ramsay, chemist, recipient of the Nobel Prize in Chemistry in 1904 (died 1916)
 John Kerr, businessman and politician
 Approximate date – Murdo Stewart MacDonald, merchant mariner (died 1938 in Mauritius)

Deaths 
 5 May – William Henry Murray, actor-manager (born 1790 in England)
 2 July – Thomas Thomson, chemist (born 1773)
 22 July – John Smith, architect (born 1781)
 25 July – Thomas Grainger, civil engineer and surveyor (born 1794)
 4 September – William MacGillivray, naturalist (born 1796)

See also 
 Timeline of Scottish history
 1852 in the United Kingdom

References 

 
Years of the 19th century in Scotland
Scotland
1850s in Scotland